The 2014–15 Cal State Bakersfield Roadrunners men's basketball team represented California State University, Bakersfield during the 2014–15 NCAA Division I men's basketball season. The Roadrunners were led by fourth year head coach Rod Barnes and played their home games at the Icardo Center. The Roadrunners competed as member of the Western Athletic Conference. They finished the season 14–19, 7–7 in WAC play to finish in a tie for fourth place. They advanced to the semifinals of the WAC tournament where they lost to New Mexico State.

Previous season 
The Roadrunners finished the season 13–19, 5–11 in WAC play to finish in a three way tie for seventh place. They advanced to the semifinals of the WAC tournament where they lost to New Mexico State.

Roster

Schedule

|-
!colspan=9 style="background:#005DAA; color:#FFD200;"| Exitbition

|-
!colspan=9 style="background:#005DAA; color:#FFD200;"| Regular season

|-
!colspan=9 style="background:#005DAA; color:#FFD200;"| WAC tournament

References

Cal State Bakersfield Roadrunners men's basketball seasons
Cal State Bakersfield